The Hedeby Viking Museum is a museum near the site of Hedeby, a former medieval city in Schleswig-Holstein, Germany focusing on the Viking Age history of the region. While the region is now in modern Germany, it was once the oldest city in Denmark until it was ceded in 1864. The museum features reconstructions of various Viking Age dwellings and ships and houses numerous artifacts discovered during the ongoing archaeological research of the area.

External links

Official website
A video regarding the museum.

Archaeological sites in Germany
History museums in Germany
History of Schleswig-Holstein
Viking Age museums
Museums in Schleswig-Holstein
Archaeological museums in Germany